Dillard may refer to:

People
 Dillard (name)

Places in the United States
 Dillard, Alabama
 Dillard, Georgia
 Dillard, New Orleans, Louisiana
 Dillard, Missouri
 Dillard, North Carolina
 Dillard, Oklahoma
 Dillard, Oregon

Arts, entertainment, and media
 Dillard & Clark, a country-rock duo
 The Dillards, an American bluegrass band

Brands and enterprises
 Dillard House, a restaurant
 Dillard's, a department store chain in the United States

Education
 Dillard High School, Fort Lauderdale, Florida, U.S.A.
 Dillard University, New Orleans, Louisiana, U.S.A.

See also